Timrå is a locality and the seat of Timrå Municipality in Västernorrland County, Sweden with 10,443 inhabitants in 2010.

It is located about 13 km north of Sundsvall (a town with a metropolitan area of some 100,000 inhabitants), and could arguably be considered a satellite to that town.

The two closest cities (Sundsvall and Härnösand) share one airport, Midlanda, that is geographically located in Timrå.

Indalsälven, one of Sweden's largest rivers with a length of 430 km, meets the Gulf of Botnia in Timrå.

In Sweden, Timrå is mainly known for its ice hockey club Timrå IK, which, as of season 2021/22 plays in the Swedish top division SHL.

In 1995, Swedish artist Bengt Lindström constructed the Y, a 30 meter high sculpture located in Timrå.

Local legend says that Sörberge, on the north side of the town, is haunted by a tall man wearing a very large coat called 'Stor Bubbas'.

Climate
Timrå has historically had a subarctic climate, but it has in recent decades more resembled a cool-summer humid continental climate.

Notable citizens
Lennart "Lillstrimma" Svedberg (1944–1972), ice hockey player
Magdalena Forsberg (1967), cross country skier, biathlon
Henrik Flyman, guitarist, composer, producer
Henrik Forsberg (1967), cross country skier
Mats Näslund (1959), ice hockey player
Anna Olsson (1964), canoeist
Anton Lander (1991), ice hockey player

Gallery

References

External links
TravelMath on Other cities, towns, and suburbs near Timra, Sweden

 
Populated places in Timrå Municipality
Medelpad
Municipal seats of Västernorrland County
Swedish municipal seats

fi:Timrån kunta